This was the first edition of the tournament.

Lara Arruabarrena and Renata Voráčová won the title, defeating Han Xinyun and Yuan Yue in the final, 6–7(2–7), 6–4, [10–4].

Seeds

Draw

Draw

References

External Links
Main Draw

Karlsruhe Open - Doubles